The 2024 Los Angeles elections will be held on March 5, 2024. Voters will elect candidates in a nonpartisan primary, with runoff elections scheduled for November 5. Seven of the fifteen seats in the City Council will be up for election.

Municipal elections in California are officially nonpartisan; candidates' party affiliations do not appear on the ballot.

City Council

District 2 
The incumbent is council president Paul Krekorian, who was re-elected with 66.7% of the vote in 2020. Krekorian is term-limited and cannot seek re-election to a fourth term in office.

Candidates

Declared 
Jillian Burgos, member of the North Hollywood neighborhood council
Adrin Nazarian, former state assemblyman

Filed paperwork 
Manuel Gonez

District 4 
The incumbent is Nithya Raman, who was elected with 52.9% of the vote in 2020. Raman is eligible to seek re-election to a second term in office.

Candidates

Declared 
Ethan Weaver, neighborhood prosecutor in the Los Angeles City Attorney's office

Announcement pending 
Nithya Raman, incumbent councilor

Endorsements

District 6 
This district is currently vacant due to the resignation of Nury Martinez after the 2022 Los Angeles City Council scandal, and will be filled in a 2023 special election.

District 8 
The incumbent is Marqueece Harris-Dawson, who was re-elected unopposed in 2020. Harris-Dawson is running for re-election to a third term in office.

Candidates

Declared 
Marqueece Harris-Dawson, incumbent councilor

District 10 
The incumbent is Heather Hutt, who was appointed to the seat in 2022 after the suspension of Mark Ridley-Thomas. Hutt running for re-election to a full term in office.

Candidates

Declared 
Heather Hutt, incumbent councilor
Reggie Jones-Sawyer, state assemblyman
Channing Martinez, community organizer and candidate for this district in 2020
Grace Yoo, attorney and runner-up for this district in 2020

Declined 
Isaac Bryan, state assemblyman

District 12 
The incumbent is John Lee, who was re-elected with 50.6% of the vote in 2020. Lee is running for re-election to a third term in office.

Candidates

Declared 
Michael Benedetto, former president of the Granada Hills South neighborhood council
John Lee, incumbent councilor

District 14 
The incumbent is Kevin de León, who was elected with 52.6% of the vote in 2020. de León is eligible to seek re-election to a second term in office.

Candidates

Declared 
Ysabel Jurado, attorney
Nick Pacheco, former councilor

Potential 
Kevin de León, incumbent councilor

References

External links
 Office of the City Clerk, City of Los Angeles

Los Angeles
2024
Los Angeles